LincVolt is a 1959 Lincoln Continental, owned by musician Neil Young, that was converted into a more fuel-efficient, hybrid demonstrator vehicle.

LincVolt participated in the Xprize Progressive Insurance Automotive X Prize. The LincVolt team had to withdraw from the X Prize competition as they were making a car whereas the purpose of the competition was to produce a commercial business plan.

A documentary film was being produced by Larry Johnson before his death on January 21, 2010.

On the morning of November 9, 2010, a fire started in LincVolt's charging system while it was recharging at a warehouse belonging to Young. The car was damaged, but it has been restored. The last version of the LincVolt's hybrid engine uses Domestic-Green Carbon-Neutral Cellulosic Ethanol from Biomass.

Versions

Version 1: Prototype
 Prime builder: Johnathan Goodwin of H-Line Conversions, Wichita, Kansas
 Generator: Mazda Wankel engine
 Prime mover electric motor:  UQM 15 kW prime mover
 Batteries: ?

Version 2010
In 2010 Neil Young gave a speech at the Specialty Equipment Market Association convention.
 Prime builder: Roy Brizio Street Rods, San Francisco; Perrone Robotics; and Johnathan Goodwin
 Generator: Capstone Microturbine 30 kW
 Prime mover electric motor: UQM 150 kW prime mover
 Batteries: Thunder Sky lithium iron phosphate battery pack made in China, #110 of 110 Amp-Hour

Version 2011: After the fire
 Prime builder: Roy Brizio Street Rods, San Francisco; and Perrone Robotics
 Generator: Capstone Microturbine 30 kW
 Prime mover electric motor: UQM 150 kW prime mover
 Batteries: A123 Systems lithium-ion battery pack

References

External links

Articles
 
 
 Young, Neil (2008-01-31) Update on Neil Young's Lincvolt: UQM is working on the propulsion system
Young, Neil (2007-11-18) NPR Weekend Edition Sunday,  Making SUVs Run Cleaner, Farther on Biodiesel
Young, Neil (2008) Neil Young Visits Sun With His Linc Volt Car
 Young, Neil (2007-11-20) CNN Gas guzzlers get new lives -- as tire-smoking hybrids
 Young, Neil (2009-03-09), Dailynews.net Musician Neil Young taps Hays commerce

Electric concept cars
Neil Young
Lincoln Motor Company